The tolar was the currency of Slovenia from 8 October 1991 until the introduction of the euro on 1 January 2007. It was subdivided into 100 stotinov (cents). The ISO 4217 currency code for the Slovenian tolar was SIT. From October 1991 until June 1992, the acronym SLT was in use.

History
The name tolar comes from Thaler, and is cognate with dollar. The tolar was introduced on 8 October 1991. It replaced the 1990 (Convertible) version of Yugoslav dinar at parity. On 28 June 2004, the tolar was pegged against the euro in the ERM II, the European Union exchange rate mechanism. All recalled banknotes can be exchanged at the central bank for current issue.

Phase-out
On 1 January 2007, the tolar was supplanted by the euro. Slovenia issues its own euro coins, like all other nations in the Eurozone.

The timescale for conversion from the tolar to the euro operated differently from the first wave of European Monetary Union (EMU). The permanent euro/tolar conversion rate was finalised on 11 July 2006 at 239.640 tolar per euro. Unlike the
first wave of EMU, this period was only a day (the conversion rates were fixed on 31 December 1998 and euro non-cash payments were possible from 1 January 1999). Also unlike the first wave of EMU which had a three-year transition period (1999–2001), there was no transition period when non-cash payments could be made in both tolar and euro. The tolar was used for all transactions (cash and non-cash) until 31 December 2006 and the euro was compulsory to use for all payments (cash and non-cash) from 1 January 2007. However, as with the first wave of EMU, cash payments with the tolar could continue until 14 January 2007, but change had to be given in euro.

Coins
In 1992, coins were introduced in denominations of 10, 20 and 50 stotinov (10, 20 and 50 stotins), 1 tolar, 2 tolarja and 5 tolarjev (2 and 5 tolars). 10 tolarjev (10 tolars) coins were added in 2000, followed by 20 and 50 tolarjev (20 and 50 tolars) in 2003. The obverse designs all show the denomination, with animals native to Slovenia on the reverses. The coins were designed by Miljenko Licul and Zvone Kosovelj and featured reliefs of animals by Janez Boljka.

Banknotes 
The first banknotes were provisional payment notes issued on 8 October 1991, in denominations of 1, 2, 5, 10, 50, 100, 200, 500, 1000, and 5000 tolarjev (0.50 and 2000 tolarjev notes were also printed, but never issued; one thousand sets with matching serial numbers were sold for 5,000 tolarjev each beginning on 6 May 2002). These notes all feature Triglav, the tallest mountain in Slovenia, on the front, and the Prince's Stone, honeycomb pattern, and Carniolan honey bee on the back.

In 1992, the Bank of Slovenia introduced the following banknotes, all of which feature notable Slovenes. The banknotes were designed by Miljenko Licul and coauthors, with portraits drawn by Rudi Španzel. They were printed by the British company De La Rue on paper produced in Radeče, Slovenia.

Historical exchange rates
Lower number indicates the tolar has a higher value.

SIT per EUR – 233.0 (April 2006); 239.5 (June 2005); 235.7 (November 2003); 227.3 (June 2002). From 1 January 2007 the rate was irrevocably set at 239.640 and has been finalised by the European Commission.
SIT per USD – 193.0 (April 2006); 198.0 (June 2005); 201.3 (November 2003); 195.06 (January 2000); 181.77 (1999); 166.13 (1998); 159.69 (1997); 135.36 (1996); 118.52 (1995).

See also

 Economy of Slovenia
 Slovenian euro coins

References

External links 
 Information on the Slovenian tolar, Bank of Slovenia
 

1991 establishments in Slovenia
2007 disestablishments in Slovenia
Currencies of Slovenia
Currencies replaced by the euro
Cultural history of Slovenia
Modern obsolete currencies
Economic history of Slovenia
Currencies introduced in 1991